Airampoa erectoclada is a species of Airampoa found in Argentina

References

External links

erectoclada
Flora of Argentina
Cacti of South America